Marie Wittich (27 May 1868 – 4 August 1931) was a German operatic soprano.  She was a Kammersängerin of the Dresden Royal Opera where she sang for 25 years and was known for the power, vibrancy and dramatic quality of her voice. She created the leading female roles in the world premieres of several operas, most famously, the title role in Salome by Richard Strauss. The novelist E. M. Forster, who saw her 1905 Dresden performance as Brünnhilde in Der Ring des Nibelungen, wrote: "She towered. She soared. Force, weight, majesty! She seemed to make history."

Biography 
Marie Wittich was born in Giessen and studied singing in Würzburg with Frau Ober-Ubrich, a sister of the prominent soprano Asminde Ubrich. She made her stage debut in 1882 in Magdeburg as Azucena in Il trovatore and went on to sing in Basle, Düsseldorf, Dresden, and Schwerin, where in 1886 she sang the title role of Gluck's Iphigénie en Aulide for the inauguration of the Mecklenburgisches Staatstheater. In 1889, she became a permanent member of the Dresden Royal Opera (Hofoper). Amongst her early performances, there were Lenore in Fidelio and Senta in The Flying Dutchman. While at Dresden, she also sang in several world premieres, including Penelope in August Bungert's Odysseus' Heimkehr (Odysseus' Return) (1896), Ulana in Paderewski's Manru (1901), and most famously the title role of Richard Strauss' Salome (1905).

During the rehearsals for the premiere of Salome, several members of the cast became dismayed by the demanding and complex nature of their parts, none more so than Wittich, who was reluctant to sing a role which Strauss described as "a sixteen-year old princess with the voice of Isolde". Her reply to him was, "One just does not write like that, Herr Strauss. Either one thing or the other." She and most of the cast nearly withdrew from the production, but eventually relented and continued with the rehearsals. However Wittich, who was 37 with a somewhat matronly figure (Strauss referred to her as "Auntie Wittich"), flatly refused to perform Salome's Dance of the Seven Veils or to kiss the severed head of John the Baptist. Her oft-quoted remark to Strauss in this respect was: "I won't do it; I'm a decent woman." In the end, the opening night on 9 December 1905 was a triumph with the singers taking 38 curtain calls. A ballerina from the Dresden company performed the Dance of the Seven Veils.

A distinguished Wagnerian singer, Wittich appeared regularly in Bayreuth from 1901 to 1909 where she sang Sieglinde, Kundry, and Isolde. She made her Covent Garden debut in 1905 as Brünnhilde in a performance described as "one of the most sympathetic and womanly Brünnhildes we have seen here." She continued to sing there through 1906 in four other Wagner roles – Elsa, Elisabeth, Isolde, and Sieglinde. Other theatres where she sang as a guest artist after 1900 were the Prague State Opera (1902), the Théâtre Royal de la Monnaie in Brussels (1907), and the National Theatre in Munich (1906 and 1907). In 1914, she made her farewell to the stage in a performance of Tristan und Isolde in Dresden, and taught singing there following her retirement.

Marie Wittich died in Dresden on 4 August 1931 at the age of 63.

References 
Notes

Sources
Fisher, Burton D, Strauss's Salome, Opera Journeys Publishing, 2005, . 
Forster, E. M., "My first opera" in Opera, June 1963, Vol. 14, .
Kuhn, Laura (ed.), "Wittich, Marie", Baker's Dictionary of Opera, Schirmer Books, 2000, . 
Kutsch, Karl, J. and Riemens, Leo, "Wittich, Marie", Großes Sängerlexikon, Francke, 1994, Vol. 2, . 
Malik, Shireen, "Salome and Her Dance of the Seven Veils" in Jennifer Heath (ed.), The Veil: Women Writers on Its History, Lore, and Politics, University of California Press, 2008, pp. 139–159. 
Puffett, Derrick,  Richard Strauss, Salome, Cambridge University Press, 1989. 
Rosenthal, Harold D. Two Centuries of Opera at Covent Garden, Putnam, 1958, p. 308.
Sadie, Stanley (ed.), "Wittich, Marie", The New Grove Dictionary of Opera, Grove's Dictionaries of Music, 1992, Vol. 4, 
Warrack, John Hamilton and West, Ewan, (eds.), "Wittich, Marie", The Concise Oxford Dictionary of Opera, Oxford University Press, 1992. . Accessed  online via subscription 27 July 2008.

External links 

Marie Wittich on Isoldes-Liebestod.info – biography in German and extensive photo gallery.

German operatic sopranos
1868 births
1931 deaths
People from Giessen